The Juniper Dunes Wilderness is a protected wilderness area comprising 7,140 acres (28.9 km²) in Franklin County, Washington.  Established in 1984, it is noteworthy for the northernmost growth of western juniper trees that live among the area's large sand dunes.

Flora and fauna
Common wildlife found in Juniper Dunes Wilderness include mule deer, bobcat, coyote, badger, skunk, weasel, porcupine, pocket gopher, kangaroo rat, several species of mouse, hawk, owl, raven, quail, partridge, pheasant, dove, numerous songbirds, and rattlesnakes.

Other than the namesake junipers, no trees grow in significant numbers here.  Other vegetation found in the Wilderness include rubber rabbitbrush, green rabbitbrush, bluebunch wheatgrass, Indian ricegrass, white sand-verbena, Franklin sandwort, sicklepod milkvetch, turpentine cymopterus, hymenopappus, prickly pear cactus, sand-dune penstemon, lanceleaf breadroot, sand dock, Carey balsamroot, wild-hyacinth, larkspur, wild flax, snow buckwheat, desert parsley Indian-potato, and silverleaf phacelia.

Access
Currently no legal access to Juniper Dunes Wilderness exists, as the entire surrounding land is privately owned.  An agreement in early 2007 with landowners allows visitors, with permission, to travel on one of several old jeep trails that end near the Wilderness boundary.

References

External links 

 

 Map of Juniper Dunes Wilderness
 Juniper Dunes Wilderness Area - BLM page

Protected areas of Franklin County, Washington
IUCN Category Ib
Wilderness areas of Washington (state)